Ophioceras is a genus of fungi in the family Magnaporthaceae.

Species

Ophioceras arcuatisporum
Ophioceras bambusae
Ophioceras boukokoense
Ophioceras cecropiae
Ophioceras chiangdaoense
Ophioceras coffeae
Ophioceras commune
Ophioceras corni
Ophioceras diaporthoides
Ophioceras dolichostomum
Ophioceras filiforme
Ophioceras friesii
Ophioceras fusiforme
Ophioceras guttulatum
Ophioceras hongkongense
Ophioceras hyptidis
Ophioceras hystrix
Ophioceras indicus
Ophioceras leptosporum
Ophioceras macrocarpum
Ophioceras majusculum
Ophioceras miyazakiense
Ophioceras ohiense
Ophioceras palmae
Ophioceras parasiticum
Ophioceras petrakii
Ophioceras sambuci
Ophioceras sorghi
Ophioceras tambopataense
Ophioceras tenuisporum
Ophioceras therryanum
Ophioceras tjibodense
Ophioceras venezuelense
Ophioceras zeae

References

External links 

Sordariomycetes genera
Magnaporthales